Maharaja Karni Singh ji  (21 April 1924 – 6 September 1988), also known as Dr Karni Singh, was from 1950 the last Maharaja of Bikaner State to hold the title of Maharaja of Bikaner, officially, until 1971, when the privy purse and all the royal titles were abolished by the Republic of India. He was also a politician, serving as a member of the Lok Sabha for twenty-five years, from 1952 to 1977, and an international clay pigeon and skeet champion.

Early life and education

Born as Prince Karni Singh on 21 April 1924 in the princely state of Bikaner, Singh's first schooling was there, after which he attended St Stephen's College, Delhi, and St Xavier's College, Bombay, where he graduated BA with Honours in History and Politics.

Career
He saw active service in the Second World War, serving in the Middle East with his grandfather, General Sir Ganga Singh, the 23rd Maharaja of Bikaner. Prince Karni succeeded his father, Lieutenant-General Maharaja Sir Sadul Singh, in 1950.

In 1952, the young Maharaja Karni Singh was elected Member of Parliament in the Lok Sabha (Lower House) of India from Bikaner constituency as an independent candidate, serving on several consultative committees of different ministries and holding his seat until 1977.

In 1964 he received the degree of Doctor of Philosophy from Bombay University, for his thesis The relationship of the Bikaner royal family with central authority (1465–1949).

He was an ardent supporter of the Rajasthani language and argued for its inclusion in the 14th schedule of the Indian Constitution.

As well as many sports, his interests included photography and painting.

Maharaja Karni Singh attended his last Olympic Games in 1980, and he died on 4 September 1988.

Family
He was the elder son of Maharaja Sadul Singh, and his name was chosen after their (kul devi) deity's name Karni mata. Singh was married to princess Sushila Kumari of Dungarpur on 25 February 1944 and they had one son and two daughters: Narendra Singh, Rajyashree Kumari, and Madhulika Kumari.

His daughter Princess Rajyashree Kumari was also a first class shooting sportswoman who received the Arjuna Award in 1968.

He was succeeded by his son Narendra Singh, who has 3 daughters: Daksha Kumari, Siddhi Kumari, and Mahima Kumari. Princess Siddhi Kumari is active in today's politics, currently MLA from Bikaner East (Rajasthan).

Sporting career
Singh won the National Championship in Clay Pigeon Trap and Skeet seventeen times and represented India at all levels of international competition. He was the first Indian to compete at five Olympic Games, which he did from 1960 to 1980, missing the Games of 1976, representing India at clay pigeon shooting at the Summer Olympics in Rome, 1960, Tokyo, 1964 (Captain), Mexico, 1968, Munich, 1972, and Moscow, 1980. His best positions in competition were eighth in 1960 and tenth in 1968.

He represented his country in the World Shooting Championships at Oslo in 1961, and the next year won a silver medal at the 38th World Shooting Championships in Cairo, after tie for 1st place, captaining the Indian team. He also competed in the World Shooting Championships at Wiesbaden in 1966, again captaining the team, and at Bologna in 1967 and San Sebastian in 1969. He competed in the Asian Shooting Championships at Tokyo in 1967 and at Seoul in 1971, where he won a gold medal. He won a silver medal at the Asian Games in Tehran, 1974, and another in the Asian Games at Kuala Lumpur in 1975.

In 1981 he won the Welsh Grand Prix for clay pigeon shooting, the North Wales Cup and the North West of England Cup.
 
In 1961 he was given the Arjuna award, becoming the first person from the world of shooting to be rewarded with that national honour. He documented his shooting experiences in a book of memoirs called From Rome to Moscow.

Singh was also a keen player of tennis, golf, and cricket, and held a private pilot's licence.

Memberships
Singh was a member of the Asiatic Society of India, the National Sports Club of India, the Cricket Club of India, the Western India Automobile Association, the Bombay Natural History Society, the Bombay Flying Club, the Bombay Presidency Golf Club, the Delhi Golf Club, the Clay Pigeon Shooting Association (of which he was an honorary life vice-president), the Willingdon Sports Club, and the Royal Wimbledon Golf Club.

Legacy
Dr. Karni Singh Shooting Range situated near the historic Tughlaqabad Fort in Delhi was named after him. It was first constructed for the 1982 Asian Games in New Delhi, and later rebuilt for the 2010 Commonwealth Games.

See also
 List of athletes with the most appearances at Olympic Games

References

External links
 
 
 Dr. Karni Singh's multi-faceted achievements - Quiz question

1924 births
1988 deaths
Indian male sport shooters
Skeet shooters
Maharajas of Bikaner
Recipients of the Arjuna Award
Sport shooters from Rajasthan
Rajasthani people
Trap and double trap shooters
People from Bikaner
Indian sportsperson-politicians
India MPs 1952–1957
India MPs 1957–1962
India MPs 1962–1967
India MPs 1967–1970
India MPs 1971–1977
Indian Army personnel
Olympic shooters of India
Shooters at the 1960 Summer Olympics
Shooters at the 1964 Summer Olympics
Shooters at the 1968 Summer Olympics
Shooters at the 1972 Summer Olympics
Shooters at the 1980 Summer Olympics
Indian Army personnel of World War II
Asian Games medalists in shooting
Lok Sabha members from Rajasthan
Shooters at the 1974 Asian Games
Shooters at the 1982 Asian Games
Rajasthani politicians
Indian royalty
Independent politicians in India
Medalists at the 1974 Asian Games
Medalists at the 1982 Asian Games
Asian Games silver medalists for India
Asian Games bronze medalists for India